Armored Saint (EP) is the first studio effort by American heavy metal band Armored Saint. It was released in 1983 on Metal Blade Records. Chrysalis Records signed the band in 1984 after listening to the EP. Opening track "Lesson Well Learned" was previously featured on Metal Blade's compilation Metal Massacre II in 1982. The EP is featured on the 2001 compilation Nod to the Old School.

Track listing
All tracks by Armored Saint

Credits
John Bush - vocals
Dave Prichard - lead guitar
Phil Sandoval - rhythm guitar
Joey Vera - bass
Gonzo Sandoval - drums

Production
Bill Metoyer - engineering
John Georgopoulos - art direction, design
Dana Ross - photography

External links 
Official Armored Saint Site
[ Armored Saint on Allmusic Guide]
Armored Saint's first EP on Encyclopaedia Metallum

1983 EPs
Armored Saint albums
Metal Blade Records EPs